Strict Tempo! is the second studio album by Richard Thompson, released in 1981. Apart from soundtracks, it is Thompson's only entirely instrumental studio album. The album consists of some of the artist's favourite tunes, all rendered as instrumentals and all arranged for guitar, mandolin, and other instruments played by Thompson. The only other musician is drummer Dave Mattacks.

After the modest sales for their 1979 album Sunnyvista, Richard and Linda Thompson found themselves without a record deal. Their earlier album Shoot Out the Lights, which was produced and financed by Gerry Rafferty, failed to secure them a deal with a major label.

To generate some income, Thompson formed his own record label Elixir Records and recorded this album mostly at the small BTW studio in London, and also at the Woodworm Studios at Cropredy.

The album was re-released on CD by Topic Records in 1992, and again on CD by Omnivore Recordings in 2011.

Track listing
All songs traditional and arranged by Richard Thompson except where noted.

"New-Fangled Flogging Reel/Kerry Reel"
"Vaillance Polka Militaire/Belfast Polka"
"Glencoe/Scott Skinner’s Rockin' Step/Bonny Banchory" (James Scott Skinner, not credited)
"Banish Misfortune"
"Dundee Hornpipe/Poppy-Leaf Hornpipe"
"Do It For My Sake"
"Rockin’ In Rhythm" (Duke Ellington)
"The Random Jig/The Grinder"
"Will Ye No Cam Back Again"
"Cam O’er The Stream Charlie/Ye Banks And Braes"
"Rufty Tufty/Nonsuch à la Mode de France"
"Andalus/Radio Marrakesh"
"The Knife-Edge" (Richard Thompson)

Musicians
 Richard Thompson – guitar, bass guitar, mandolin, banjo, mandocello, dulcimer, harmonium, pennywhistle, dobro
 Dave Mattacks – drums, piano on Ye Banks And Braes

Other personnel
 John Borthwick – engineer, BTW
 Simon Nicol – engineer, Woodworm
 Richard Thompson – producer, liner notes

Topic Records, 1992 CD 
 Tony Engle – design 
 David Suff – illustration (cover drawing), liner notes
 Fin Costello – photography

References

1981 albums
Richard Thompson (musician) albums
Omnivore Recordings albums